Pierre Celestin Yana (born 12 January 1978) is a Cameroonian boxer. He competed in the men's light heavyweight event at the 2004 Summer Olympics.
2008
Champion de France de boxe thaïlandaise classe A
2007
France / thaïlande BONJOUR
2006
France / thaïlande
Vice champion du Grand tournoi de Kick Boxing de Paris Bercy
2005
Champion de France de boxe thaïlandaise classe B
Grand tournoi Paris Bercy
2004
JEUX OLYMPIQUES D'ATHENES 
2003 / 2004 BOXE ANGLAISE
- Champion du Cameroun
- Médaille d'argent au 15 éme Jeux Africain BOSTWANA
- Médaille d'OR Tournoi International à NIAMEY NIGERS
- Médaille de Bronze au championat d’afrique 81 Kg
2000 / 2001 KICK BOXING
- Champion provincial Douala Cameroun
- Champion du Cameroun
- Champion d'Afrique
1999 BOXE FRANÇAISE
- Champion provincial Douala Cameroun
- Champion du Cameroun
- Champion d'Afrique
1998 FULL CONTACT 
- Champion provincial Douala Cameroun
- Champion du Cameroun
- Champion d'Afrique.

References

1978 births
Living people
Cameroonian male boxers
Olympic boxers of Cameroon
Boxers at the 2004 Summer Olympics
Place of birth missing (living people)
Light-heavyweight boxers